Winter is the seventh EP released by the South Korean boy group MBLAQ, in time to suit the approaching Winter season. The album was released online on November 25, 2014 at 12AM (KST) and offline on November 26, 2014. The album consists of 5 tracks, and all the tracks included in the album are self-composed ballad songs by the members themselves.

It was the final album to feature members Lee Joon and Thunder before their departures one month later on December 16, 2014.

Promotions 
Although MBLAQ did not officially promote the album on music programs, they held a Curtain Call concert at Olympic Hall in Olympic Park from November 29 to November 30, 2014.

Concept 
The teaser images were released on MBLAQ's official website as well as J. Tune Camp's Facebook and Twitter. It showed the five members presenting themselves in black outfits from suits to knitted sweaters. As they did not stare into the camera directly, they exuded different kinds of emotions to match the winter atmosphere.

Track listing

Chart performance

Album chart

Sales and certifications

Release history

References

External links
 MBLAQ's Official Site

2014 EPs
MBLAQ EPs
Korean-language EPs